Democratic Coalition may refer to:

 Democratic Coalition (Greece) (1936), a former electoral alliance
 Democratic Coalition (Greece, 2015), an electoral alliance
 Democratic Coalition (Hungary) (est. 2011), a political party in Hungary
 Democratic Coalition of Namibia (1994-2009)
 British Columbia Democratic Coalition (2004-2005), a coalition of provincial parties in Canada
 Coalition démocratique de Montréal (1989-2001), a former municipal party in Quebec, Canada
 Coalition Démocratique–Montréal Écologique (1994-1998), a former municipal alliance in Quebec, Canada
 New Zealand Democratic Coalition (1996), a proposed party in New Zealand
 Slovak Democratic Coalition (1997-2002, SDK), a former political party in Slovakia
 Democratic Coalition (Spain) (1979), a former electoral alliance around the People's Alliance
 The Democratic Coalition, an anti-Donald Trump political action group. (Formerly known as The Democratic Coalition against Trump.)
 United Democratic Coalition (est. 1987, CDU), a Portuguese electoral alliance

See also
 National Democratic Coalition (disambiguation)
 Democratic Alliance (disambiguation)
 Democratic Party (disambiguation)
 Democrat Party (disambiguation)
 Lists of political parties